Dinamo is a Moscow Metro station on the Zamoskvoretskaya line. It opened on 11 September 1938 as part of the second stage of the system. It was named for the former Dinamo Stadium, the home stadium of FC Dynamo Moscow. Passengers may transfer directly to the Bolshaya Koltsevaya line via Petrovsky Park station.

It was the deepest station in Moscow Metro from 1938 until 1944.

Location
Dinamo is under Leningradsky Avenue in the Aeroport District of Moscow near Petrovsky Park and the Petrovsky Palace. The VTB Arena was built on the same site and dinamo stadium adjacent to the station.

Design and Layout
Designed by Ya. Likhtenberg and Yury Revkovsky, the station features a sport-themed decoration with bas-reliefs designed by Ye. Yason-Manzer depicting sportsmen in various practices in the vestibules and the central hall.

The pylons, faced with red tagilian marble and onyx have porcelain medallions also showing sportsmen. The walls are faced with onyx, white and grey marble, neatly tiled together. The floor is revetted with black marble, although the platforms were initially covered with asphalt.

There are two identical vestibules, each on the northern side of the Leningradsky Avenue, and the architect for the vestibules was Dmitry Chechulin.

There is an underground walkway between Dinamo and Petrovsky Park stations that eased transfers between the stations. That walkway opened on 29 December 2020.

Scientific Use
In 1940, physicists Georgy Flyorov and Konstantin Petrzhak used the station for their observations of the decay of uranium. The depth of the station reduced the potential effect of cosmic rays in their work. Working at night, the pair discovered spontaneous fission.

Gallery

References

Moscow Metro stations
Railway stations in Russia opened in 1938
Zamoskvoretskaya Line
Railway stations located underground in Russia
Dynamo Moscow